This is a list of characters from Jigoku Sensei Nūbē.  It can be divided into several groups, each one distinct from the others. The first group is the staff of Dōmori Elementary that is made up of the teachers and other adults (mostly) who assist in the education and welfare of the students. They include Nūbē, his "perverted obsession" Ritsuko Takahashi, and other teachers, as well as the principal. The second group, is the student body. Each student brings a unique personality and set of experiences to their education along with their experiences with the supernatural. Most characters are students in Nūbē's class 5-3, but students in the fifth and other grades (such as Hiroshi's soccer teammates and Makoto's "girlfriend", Ai Shinozaki) are also included..

The third group includes the various yōkai Nūbē and the citizens of Dōmori they encounter. Many of these spirits appear only once. Some make cameo appearances later when various spirits reappear to the advantage, or disadvantage, of Nūbē and the others. Some, such as the yōko Tamamo and the yuki-onna Yukime, end up intertwined in the events of Doumori, either assisting or tormenting Nūbē as they feel at that moment. The last group of characters is the humans who don't quite fit any of the other categories, yet are connected to the affairs of Nūbē or his students. These include exorcists such as "itako-girl" Izuna Hazuki and the crooked Buddhist priest Oshō,  and even the parents of the 5-3 students.

Doumori Elementary staff
The main characters are a group of fifth grade teachers at Doumori Elementary.

Meisuke Nueno

First off, he's a powerful exorcist who deals with the affairs between humans and yōkai in his adopted home of Doumori. Second, and just as importantly, he's the teacher of class 5-3 of Doumori Elementary, both guiding and protecting them from the spiritual encounters they face. Both jobs are equally important to him in their own ways: he chooses to protect the innocent and punish the wicked, both human and yōkai, focusing primarily on those still young and innocent enough to have the need of a guardian, as his teacher had done before her death.

Nūbē is trained as an exorcist to have many means of facing his yōkai encounters. This grotesque appendage, usually sealed within a black glove on his left hand, if unsealed, allows him to use his own spiritual energies combined with the powers of the oni both to attack evil opponents and for other means, such as communicating with other yōkai or freeing spirits. While Nūbē typically is able to control the power, he is usually only able to use a fraction of its true powers and abilities, for the oni is so powerful Nube himself can't control it and can devour his body and will if became overboard. The oni is actually being held by Nūbē's Sensei, who died being consumed by the oni when trying to save Nūbē. Nūbē's teacher is also a powerful exorcist and her ultimate sacrifice that left her killed is the reason Nūbē wanted to become both a teacher and an exorcist.

Other than the Oni no Te, Nūbē uses other spiritual artifacts for his battles. , a white paper-like sutra, is used by Nūbē to surround and seal certain yōkai phenomenon to either hold them down or exorcise them without the need of the Oni no Te,as for a blind kid ghost.  He also possesses a crystal ball which can make certain spirits and phenomenon visible to the human eye,like when he spotted something on one of his students, and a set of prayer beads he can attack with or use as part of his summonings.  He also eventually creates his own kudagitsune, a product of another kudagitsune he borrows from itako-girl Izuna and his Oni no Te, and has mastered several spiritual techniques such as the "youshin jutsu" (a technique where he can create a separate spiritual body that moves about by itself whenever he is asleep or meditating), and the separation of his physical body and spirit in order to transcend into other realms,for example,for challenging a ghost of a swimmer.

Personality-wise, Nūbē can be both a great, fun-loving guy or a serious, focused man dependent on what you see him for. On matters of either spiritual or educational importance, he is a serious individual focused on doing the job perfectly.  Not only does this allow him to conquer one yōkai crisis after another, but it also allows him to be a bit obsessive towards making sure his students learn what they need to and don't fool around or forget anything. (a problem considering the underachieving attributes of several of his male students). Outside his work, though, Nūbē is a fun, almost happy-go-lucky guy with too many faults to his name.  He is always chasing after beautiful women (especially the more buxom ones), spending the little money he does have on pachinko, and consistently starving his way to payday while living off whatever they serve in school cafeteria or the freebies he can get, or finding a way to get rich quick (even if it means using the Oni no Te to do so), all the while trying to avoid the scorns or troubles that his rivals throw his way.  While he doesn't like living the teacher's life a good chunk of the time, Nūbē does find that it does has its rewards.

Voiced by: Ryōtarō Okiayu
Played by: Ryuhei Maruyama

Ritsuko Takahashi
Head teacher of class 5-2 of Doumori Elementary,  is considered the madonna (term for "beautiful unmarried woman") of the school.  She is very serious and dedicated to her job as a teacher, but at the same time is very edgy and overtly scared when it comes to the unknown, in particular the spirits and yōkai the school constantly encounters. Her nature is a double-edged blade for Nūbē: while her beautiful exterior makes him desire her and all the things he wants to do to her, her oversensitive nature towards the supernatural like the antics about spirits and his artifacts makes him tease her all the time about it...and face her wrath as a result.

At the start of the series, Ritsuko-sensei is probably the last person Nūbē would ever end up with in a relationship.  Every time he tried to win her heart, she would knock him away due to being too scared of his spiritual obsessions.  But as the series progresses, she slowly gains the courage to face the yōkai menaces...and as a result, slowly realizes how Nūbē is helping all those in need...and even begins to appreciate what he does both for students and all those he assists.  But while her feelings slowly makes her try to become closer to the male teacher, it ends up attracting scorn from Yukime, the yuki-onna who sees herself as the one who is the teacher's true love.  The love triangle between the two teachers and the spirit girl becomes a key theme in the later part of the manga, as Nūbē is forced to decide between feelings and emotions and figure out which he wants to spend his life with.

Voiced by: Michiko Neya
Played by: Mirei Kiritani

Ishikawa-sensei
Ishikawa-sensei (石川先生) is a teacher found alongside the 5th Grade teachers, most likely the gym teacher for that grade.  Consistently running around in a jumpsuit and with his messy hair, beard and glasses, he occasionally assists in the issuance of advice and known spiritual information out of what he has known and experienced.  However, he is also somewhat of a bad influence himself, known for keeping cards for various porn shops in his jumpsuit. (as Nūbē accidentally discovers one time when they fall out of a borrowed suit)  Although it is unknown whether or not he really is a 5th Grade teacher, Ishikawa-sensei is commonly seen alongside the 5th Grade teachers, thus his inclusion here. He also has a tendency of avoiding showers up to more than a month, and has a fetish for wearing women's undergarment, which turned out working against Nube when Minki, the sister of the Oni no Te (Baki) comes from hell to reclaim them.

Voiced by: Yoshiyuki Kouno

Ōtsuki-sensei
The hot-blooded head of class 5-1 of Doumori Elementary, Ōtsuki-sensei (大月先生) is another exorcist/teacher combination.  However, unlike Nūbē, he believes that all phenomenon are a result of plasma, not spiritual power. These beliefs lead to the two teachers consistently feuding over what is the true nature of the many problems that persist in and around the school; while the students in both classes also face off due to the loyalties to their home-teacher's beliefs.  Using his own scientific knowhow and research, he uses several devices and inventions that allow him to research and take out any of these threats. (sort of similar to the scientific research and inventions done in Ghostbusters).  Although Ootsuki-sensei appears a couple prominent times early on, he merely fades into the background as the manga goes on.

Voiced by: Yasunori Masutani

Other staff members

The Principal
The administrative leader of the elementary school, the principal consistently tries to do a good job in keeping his school running smoothly and without error even with all of the crazy spiritual phenomenon going on under his watch.  While he may or may not have known that Nūbē was both an exorcist and a teacher when he started working at this school, he soon prides it as a valuable asset to assisting in his staff.

The Vice-Principal
Not too much is known about this flat-topped, glasses wearing administrative outside being an associate alongside the Principal in running Doumori Elementary and consistently being in the background along with his boss and the other teachers and staff of the school.

Mami Kuroi
One of the newer teachers at Doumori Elementary, Mami Kuroi (Kuroi  Mami, 黒井 まみ) is the head of the first-grade class of 1-3.  However, opposed to Nūbē's exorcisms, her interests and studies are in the occult and witchcraft, having studied in a German university and across Europe to further her own knowledge and skills in such. Although she looks like a little girl, she's actually 28 years old, several years older than the more experienced Nūbē. Nūbē does not like her obsession with the evil arts and yells at her from doing them. It doesn't help that her 1st Grade classroom is two floors down from his 5th Grade class, forcing him to occasionally feel the influence of her magic unknowingly. (until he comes down and puts a stop to her nonsense)  Some of her various magic skills include various curses, summonings, transformations, voodoo dolls and even flying on her own little broomstick. (not to mention a flat-top hat that rises into a witches hat whenever she does her magic)

When Kuroi-sensei first arrives at the school, she is immediately smitten by her male staff-mate and decides to use her magic to try and win him over. (including sealing his Oni no Te inside a cute hand-made glove)  But after consistently being yelled at by Nūbē, not to mention possibly seeing both Ritsuko-sensei and Yukime go after him, she decides to summon her own demonic love slave in the form of the "Western Devil" Beelzebub.

Students

Class 5-3
The students of Class 5-3.

Hiroshi Tateno
Hiroshi Tateno (Tateno Hiroshi 立野広) is the main male student character in the series and one of Nūbē's most active supporters.  A transfer student who arrives in Doumori Elementary at the start of the manga, he is at first suspicious of his teacher's exorcism claims, but eventually comes around due to being saved from one spiritual problem after another.  Typical of many young shōnen leads in manga and anime, he is the courageous, heroic male of the class who is always standing up to fight against any obstacle, whether they be human or yōkai or whether it makes sense or not.  His favorite pastime is playing soccer for the school. Hiroshi's downside is his own stupidity: he has some of the worst grades in Nūbē's class and once even set a record for having a hundred 0s in a row on his tests.  This lack of brains both causes him to have outlandish comments on simple ideas and leads him to many of his yōkai problems. He once even wet his pants after a ghost scared him in a restroom.  His character's name is a tribute to the main male lead of Dokonjyou Gaeru, a classic 70s Weekly Shōnen Jump series Shou and Okano used as an influence for "Nūbē".

Voiced by: Toshiko Fujita
Played by: Taishi Nakagawa

Kyōko Inaba
The fiery-haired, fiery tempered female of Nūbē's class, Kyōko Inaba (Inaba Kyōko 稲葉郷子) is the student that trusts and even possibly likes the teacher the most.  Her first encounter with him actually occurred several years earlier, when Nūbē (then a college student) saved Kyōko (then a little girl) from an inari spirit. (though it is suggested they may have met earlier in a past life)  She is seen as one of the most caring characters, usually looking after the welfare of Nūbē and the rest of the class and showing an emotional attachment towards them whenever something happens to one she cares about.  But while Kyōko appears cute and innocent at first, she can possess a violent temper that can drive her friends and even her teacher a tad crazy (though it does tone down later on).  When Hiroshi joins the class, she can't stand the annoying boy, but slowly does develop hidden romantic feelings towards him as the series goes on.  On the other hand, she consistently has a love/hate rivalry with the closest to a best friend that she has, Miki Hosokawa, usually over physical matters such as her flat chest, big butt, and Sailor Moon-esque pigtails.  Her name is an homage to the female lead of Dokonjyou Gaeru. (where, not coincidentally, this Kyōko is also in love with a Hiroshi)

Voiced by: Rumi Kasahara
Played by: Airi Matsui

Miki Hosokawa
Possibly the greatest troublemaker in Nūbē's class, Miki Hosokawa (Hosokawa Miki 細川美樹) is known best for her big mouth, her vast spiritual knowledge and her big bust.  At the start, Miki was a mere tattletale, consistently chatting on and on about various rumors and such, especially if Nūbē was involved.  But after a near-fatal encounter with a tattletale yōkai that first pinned blame on her for several downright hurtful rumors and then attempted to eat her, she begins to tone down her talking and starts focusing on more spiritual matters.  Miki begins to do consistent research on various spirit and yōkai manners, to the point where even her teacher came to her for things he may not know. Most of this is merely knowledge, she consistently looks for supernatural means to assist her, either for her rumor mill or to get rich quick. 
One of her most important spiritual developments was gaining the ability to become a rokurokubi, where she can spiritually stretch her head and neck to go undercover to anywhere she chooses.  Extremely vain about her physicality, Miki prides in her growing buxom figure (she grows from a B-cup to an F-cup over the course of the series) and flaunts it whenever she can.  Her name (as well as her hairstyle and physical"attributes") is an homage to the tragic Miki Makimura, the main heroine in another of the main Nūbē influences: Go Nagai's classic horror series Devilman.

Voiced by: Miina Tominaga
Played by: Hinako Sano

Katsuya Kimura
The "juvenile delinquent" of the class, Katsuya Kimura (Kimura Katsuya 木村克也) acts much worse than he really is towards Nūbē and his other classmates.  At the start of the series, Katsuya is consistently portrayed as a loner, either due to being misunderstood by his classmates, his own cowardice or from his delinquent behaviors such as smoking or stealing charity for a good cause.  But as the series goes on, he slowly comes to grips with himself and joins in with Nūbē and his friends where he is one of the main members of the class.  Katsuya is a huge pervert towards sexy females, an attribute that gets him into a huge idolation of Miki. (though she sees treats him like her dog)  He also finds himself consistently with the worst grades in class alongside both Hiroshi and Makoto.  But while he is a coward and a bad seed, he is amazingly also a loving, caring and protective big brother towards his little sister, Manami.

Voiced by: Kazunari Tanaka
Played by: Ryo Yoshizawa

Makoto Kurita
While the same age as all of his classmates, Makoto Kurita (Kurita Makoto 栗田まこと) is perhaps the youngest in heart and spirit of class 5-3.  At the start of the series, this bowl-haired boy finds himself the most emotional of the students, running and screaming away from any scary phenomenon.  But with Nūbē's guidance and the assistance of his friends, he slowly learns to face his fears and grow up in certain ways.  One of Makoto's greatest strengths is his kind and friendly nature, allowing him to try and remain cheerful in the face of both human and yōkai threats.  However, he remains the most childlike of Nūbē's students, both in stature (though he is small, he is constantly hoping for the day he will "grow up") and his love of kiddy pastimes like keeping pets or watching sentai series. (His most favorite being Chou Kiken Sentai Kakukaku Ranger which is a slight parody in name of the series Ninja Sentai Kaku Ranger, but translates as Extremely Dangerous Sentai Nuclear Ranger)  While he also receives horrible grades like Hiroshi and Katsuya, he actually puts in effort to try to improve himself in any way possible.   His name and the model for his character design are both inspired from the  Kazuo Umezu manga series Makoto-chan.

Voiced by: Megumi Urawa
Played by: Yuri Chinen

Akira Yamaguchi
Akira Yamaguchi (Yamaguchi Akira 山口晶), one of the smartest students in Nūbē's class, is also the one that goes through a slight character change as the series goes on.  At the start of the series, Akira is merely a bright, but slightly unlucky boy who tries his best but can never achieve what he's capable of.  The source of this bad luck was a near-death experience where he went to the Sanzu River, where a yōkai consistently stops anyone that tries to complete their tasks.  After Nūbē exorcises this spirit, Akira finds a bit more luck, but remains a more generic character.  But later in the series, Akira's modest personality changes towards that of being the "mad scientist" of the class, consistently using technology to bridge the gap between humans and yōkai and showing off in order to do so.  Originally, Akira was paired alongside Hiroshi, Kyoko, Makoto and Miki as part of the main set of students whom allies with Nūbē.  But because of Akira's earlier "plain" personality, he fell out of favor over more dynamic characters like Katsuya.  Regardless, he does remain a semi-major character throughout the whole manga run.  Like Miki, Akira's name is based on the main male lead in Go Nagai's Devilman.

Voiced by: Michiyo Yanagisawa Played by: Kazuki Shimizu

Shuichi Shirato
The richest and most snobbish member of Nūbē's class, Shuichi Shirato (Shirato Shuichi 白戸秀一) is the son of the owners of one of the finest restaurants in Doumori.  Because of this, this "classy" boy consistently taunts Nūbē's personal tastes, both in cuisine and in his lack of material possessions.  But while there are many times the teacher can't stand his arrogant attitude, Nūbē consistently finds a way to help him whenever he finds himself caught in a yōkai situation.  In a slight deviation from his teacher and classmates, Shuichi finds interest in more scientific means of the supernatural such as aliens and cryptozoology, trying to show there are things other than yōkai out there, but consistently finding Nūbē back to assist him. Still, Shuuichi isn't an evil person per se; he also sincerely loves animals, to the point of being willing to give up his life to stop an angry yōkai that once was a puppy.

Voiced by: Junichi Kanemaru
Played by: Gaku Sano

Masaru Kaneda
Masaru Kaneda (Kaneda Masaru 金田勝) is the self-proclaimed "class bully" of 5-3, consistently trying to beat up on others weaker than he is (such as Makoto) and finding dissidence with anyone that stands in his way.  But two things consistently end up foiling his schemes: Hiroshi (who stands up for those Kaneda bullies) and the yōkai whom haunt him whenever he ends up disturbing one.  His biggest gripe is when his name is mispronounced as "Kintama Saru", which is Japanese for "testicle monkey".  Though he mostly works alone, he occasionally has two lackeys in the class that he bosses around.

Voiced by: Ginzou Matsuo Played by: Takeaki Shima

Noriko Nakajima
Noriko Nakajima (Nakajima Noriko 中島法子) is the sweet, cute, and possibly most "normal" girl in class 5-3 compared to some of her classmates.  Unlike the others, Noriko never tries to look for trouble, but trouble constantly does seem to find her.  Originally a "background character" early on (mostly found alongside her best friend Shizuka), "Noro-chan" slowly becomes one of the more prominent members of the class and a consistent target for spiritual activity.  Miki in particular has a beef against her: With her cute face, shoulder-length pink hair and the second-largest bust in the class, the buxom blonde always gets upset whenever Noriko steals the spotlight away from her (consistently saying Noro-chan no kuse ni!!, or "That Noro-chan!")  While she does seem docile and quiet, Noriko does occasionally unleash a wilder and more playful side (but it takes certain yōkai phenomenon to do so). She's also known as a bookworm and a rather clever tactician; once she was the key to resolving a very creepy case that involved the ghost of the school library and a series of kidnappings related to the ghost's favorite book, which incidentally was the same as Noriko's.

Voiced by: Machiko Toyoshima
Played by: Kaho Mizutani

Shizuka Kikuchi
Another of the more prominent "background characters", Shizuka Kikuchi (Kikuchi Shizuka 菊地静) was actually introduced as a one-joke character. When Nūbē does a class on the Ichimatsu Doll, he ends up using a cute girl with long black hair (Shizuka) as part of a joke to get rid of a possession. Outside this early joke, this female typically is found in the background, either doing things alongside the rest of the class or hanging out usually with her best friend Noriko. But while she seems merely innocent in the background, a later chapter reveals that it allows her to easily tattle on her classmates to Nūbē, due to a strong sense of justice that she holds that she puts above her friends. (It nearly gets her in trouble with a dangerous team of yōkai.)

Voiced by: Emi Uwagawa
Played by: Sara Takatsuki

Ayumi Kinoshita
A quiet, studious member of class 5-3, Ayumi Kinoshita (Kinoshita Ayumi 木下あゆみ) is another student who has a spiritual ability, but one that actually helps her in more ways than one.  Typically, Ayumi is a sickly, bedridden girl that would possibly have never had the chance to get an education.  Yet when she was younger, Nūbē (who was still in college) taught her the "youshin jutsu", an ability that allows her to separate her spiritual body from her physical one, making her seem that she can walk and live like a normal person.  Using this, Ayumi was able to partake in an education at Doumori Elementary, and even joined Nūbē's class when she hit 5th grade. Since it takes many years of practice to master this, her youshin abilities is not in complete form as it would dissolve whenever she gets in contact with water. Ayumi's favorite pastime is reading, spending all her time in class or even outside reading books without taking too much notice of the fun and activities of her classmates (though there are some occasions where she joins in). While Ayumi usually uses her youshin abilities to try to live a normal life as a schoolgirl, she can also use it to transform her physical form or her clothing to something more adventurous, which came in handy when Hiroshi, Kyoko and the others nearly got in trouble.  Furthermore, she may even have a small crush on Kaneda (thanks to a possible literary awakening due to her influence) and he is possibly the only person other than Nūbē who knows about her true nature.

Other students

Mamoru Kazama
Another gifted at football from Doumori Elementary beside Hiroshi Tateno, Mamoru Kazama (Kazama Mamoru, 風間守) is a student in Ritsuko Takahashi's class 5-2.

Voiced by Mari Maruta

Ai Shinozaki
Considered one of the most talented students at Doumori Elementary, Ai Shinozaki (Shinozaki Ai, 篠崎愛) is a sixth-grader in class 6-5, one year ahead of Nube's class.  A member of the Shinozaki zaibatsu, she's a beautiful girl who looks older than she really is (she's tall and slender, and with a big bust that rivals Miki's and Ritsuko-sensei's), has mastery of several musical instruments including the violin and piano (in the anime, her episode happens right after she wins a violin contest), as well as fluency of three foreign languages other than Japanese.  However, under this perfect exterior, this spectacle-wearing female has many problems of her own.

Ai grows tired of consistently practicing under the pressure of her family in order to succeed, detests being treated as a goddess by others who only think of her as someone who'll make them look good for being her friends, and also has problems in occasionally shoplifting to get things without paying for them (according to her, she developed this habit to reassure herself that she was a normal person with flaws).  It is these problems that get her in problems with the occasional yōkai, who illuminate her own problems and end up exposing her to Nūbē and the right path.

In this case, Ai was possessed by a demon that manifested itself as tell-tale eyes that would appear on her hand and later on her whole body, and didn't disappear until she openly confessed to Nube and Makoto, until then her only friend, that she was a shoplifter and the reason why she stole things.

While Ai seems to hold a lonely life, she somehow has befriended Makoto and may feel something more for him, though he doesn't really notice any romantic feelings and would rather use her to sing the theme songs of his favorite sentai shows. Ai's name is connected to a series of horror films involving another set of children named "Ai and Makoto" (explaining possibly why she has connections towards him).

Voiced by Hitomi Oikawa
Played by Yurika Nakamura

Izuna Hazuki
Izuna Hazuki (Hazuki Izuna, 葉月いずな) is a student at Doumori Middle School, a hot blooded and reckless apprentice-level Itako, that usually overestimates her abilities and gets herself into trouble. She likes to use her powers to get in exchange for money and often got scolded by Nube because of it. She is an expert kudagitsune tamer.

Voiced by Chieko Honda
Played by Mizuki Yamamoto

Monster characters

Oni
The Oni within Nūbē are extremely powerful demon creature that literally come from the depths of hell to cause havoc and destruction upon our world. Unlike many oni depictions within popular Japanese culture, these oni are a hybrid combination of the classic horned loin-cloth being and Western devil beasts with claws, horns and immense strength and demonic powers. All of the oni, particularly the Oni no Te and its connections, are beings from an eight-tiered hell, where various devils and demonic beings become more powerful the deeper you head. The demon trio come from the 6th tier of this hell, Shonetsu (焦熱, which translates into "scorching heat", but in the combination 焦熱地獄, shonetsu jigoku, can stand for Inferno or Burning Hell). Each one has climbed their way through the upper levels of hell until they have reached a passage into the human world: near a spinning sphere in the playground of Doumori Elementary.

Oni no Te (Baki)
The first and possibly most powerful of the oni we encounter, this is the being living as Nūbē's left hand from the beginning of the series. Sealed under a black glove, this being is unleashed whenever the teacher needs it, allowing for him to access a greater extent of his spiritual power through this demonic limb. While the beast appears to be under Nūbē's control at first, the Oni slowly starts having a life of its own and unleashing its tremendous full power. And while the teacher is himself an exorcist, he cannot control the oni on his own, which would lead to him being controlled and devoured. The key to this control lies inside the oni itself, in the spirit of his former teacher Minako-sensei, locked away within the demon after her tragic sacrifice to save her former student. She uses her own spiritual power to hold back the Oni, allowing Nube to access its power without becoming consumed by it; because she is needed to keep the beast at bay, Nūbē is constantly looking for a twofold way to both finally control the Oni once and for all and free his former teacher from her imprisonment inside the creature that has become his left hand. Later in the series, we discover that he is the eldest (and most dim-witted) brother of a trio of oni siblings, but still extremely powerful if left to his own devices.

At the end of the series, he became good after all the good deeds he experienced.

Zekki
The middle brother of the Oni trio, Zekki (絶鬼) is the most cruel and heartless beings Nūbē and his allies face. Although he appears like a young teenage male, he is an extremely powerful and dangerous being who takes pleasure in killing anyone who gets in his way: male or female, young or old. His greatest peculiarity is the usage of musical terms (and even a baton) to describe the carnage and destruction he creates.

Zekki comes to the human world after three years of climbing in search of the man who now possesses his brother Baki: the exorcist-teacher Nūbē. After easily thrashing Izuna Hazuki the Itako girl, he makes easy work of Nūbē, Yukime and Tamamo in order to see the hidden 'power' the teacher supposedly used to seal Baki in his hand. Once he realized that Nūbē did not seal his brother on his own, relying instead on Minako's control from inside the oni, he decides to stay his hand no longer. The battles between the trio and Zekki grew more desperate, with Nūbē on the losing side despite the help of a true demon-sealing bracelet. After sacrifices made by Nūbē's students, Yukime and Tamamo, Nūbē voluntarily unsealed the oni inside his hand and was apparently consumed by Baki. He retained his human heart, however, and after defeating Zekki was revived by the mermaid Hayame.

Voiced by: Hikaru Midorikawa Played by: Ryosuke Yamada

Minki
Minki (眠鬼) is the youngest, but just as destructive (and annoying) female sibling of the oni family. Although she possesses similar power and abilities to her older brothers Baki and Zekki, the source of her (and possibly all the oni) power comes from a pair of panties that she wears. (according to legend, most of an oni's spiritual power comes from their underwear or loincloth)  When she accidentally loses her panties in the human world, she is forced to cross over to get them back, even if it means making Class 5-3 nude in the process. Although she sort of gets them back (they were being worn by the perverted Ishikawa-sensei), Nūbē seizes them and, in a strange move, makes the Oni-girl join his class. His belief was that outside her panty-powers, Minki was a quiet, nice girl who needed to learn a few things. Although she seemed rather strange at first, Minki showed a protective, kinder side than she initially portrayed, even protecting her classmates just as Nūbē does. But at the moment she got her panties back, Minki regained her full, demonic power and attitude, fighting against her teacher and particularly showing hatred for the males of the class. But at the climax of her rampage, just as she prepared to destroy her teacher and school, her panties fell off her body once again, making her drop her attack and nearly destroying her in the process. Nūbē saves her, however, believing her to be different from the other Oni and choosing to give her a second chance in the human world.

After nearly destroying the school and Nūbē, Minki becomes both a valuable student and a key ally in his battle to protect his students and fight against intruding enemies and yōkai. Although she does not contain all of her Oni power as she did with her panties, she does have enough to occasionally play naughty tricks on her friends and classmates. (she slowly does seem to accept them as friends, but has a hard time doing so due to her own circumstances)  She is also able to assist her teacher in a valuable way: as he faces a couple enemies that force the Oni no Te away from him, Minki is able to fuse with Nūbē to allow for her Oni power to be used by him. A key difference between her and Baki's arrangement, though, is that the teacher is able to use a fuller extent of Minki's power due to theirs being a conscious partnership. Outside of battle, Minki not only sees Nūbē as her teacher, but her "big brother" as well, as her 'real' big brother is sealed in his hand. This leads to some rather awkward situations between the meaning of being a human sibling to being an Oni sibling.

As a final note: Minki is the only member of the Oni siblings that does not have a full demonic form. Although she can exhibit oni appearance such as her scantly clad appearance and demonic hands and feet, this form takes more of a human appearance than either Zekki or Baki. (possibly showing an influence from the American comic series Witchblade)  Just as peculiarly, two horn-like protrusions that allow for the formation of her long pigtails remain visible both in "human" and "Oni" forms.

Kitsune

Long a well known yōkai, the kitsune are a group of animal spirits usually connected with foxes. While any fox is a kitsune, there are special foxes, known as yōko who are some of the most spiritually powerful beings in existence. Yōko are known to have many different abilities at their disposal, such as the creation and manipulation of illusions and fire, as well as the ability to use a special "transformation jutsu" that can allow them to blend in with humans, usually to cause chaos and mischief within our world. At the same time, the kitsune and yōko are also connected with inari, local harvest festivals in Japan upon which play an integral role within.

Tamamo

Tamamo (玉藻), also known as Kyōsuke Tamamo (Tamamo Kyōsuke 玉藻京介) in his human form, is the most important of the yōko in the manga series: a powerful being who is both Nūbē's ally and ultimate rival. First arriving at Doumori Elementary as a bishōnen male teacher who wins the hearts and minds of his students and fellow staff, his true intent was to seize the skull of Nūbē's student Hiroshi Tateno which is his 'perfect skull' for transforming into a human. When Nūbē was forced to come to Hiroshi's rescue, the two got into an intense battle upon which the true form of the golden fox-creature was revealed and nearly defeated Nūbē. Due to Hiroshi's courage, however, Tamamo was defeated, though not for good. He returned soon after, intrigued by Nūbē and how his powers was amplified when fighting for his students. He learns that it is the power of the human heart, and not understanding it, tries to know more by creating situations that force Nūbē to fight or via simple observation. Tamamo also abandoned his teacher's disguise to work as a doctor in Doumori Hospital, where his 400 years of knowledge accumulated to cause misery went into healing others, which he thought would be a good way to learn more about humanity.

Having existed and trained his spiritual powers for centuries, Tamamo has become adept in many spiritual powers and abilities that he holds even without perfecting his "transformation jutsu". He is a master of "illusion jutsu", able to manipulate anyone to see whatever he portrays as long as there is motion. (even to the extent of creating clones of himself off the display of video game screens)  Offensively, he uses a "yōko foxfire jutsu", allowing him to create and control a powerful fire-based attack which he can increase in power and intensity to burn his opponents. He can also handle certain other spiritual abilities like Nube's such as assisting in controlling spiritual energy and even the "youshin jutsu". When not using spiritual power, his main weapon is a paw-like neck catcher, which primary function is the extraction of suitable skulls for his "transformation jutsu", but can also be broken apart to surround himself and an opponent within a barrier for more powerful attacks. In the manga, it was revealed that the skull he was currently using in the course of the series came from a dead mountain climber, who was a well-to-do college student. The encounter between Tamamo and the student's fiancee marked one of the important turning points in his character development.

At the start of the series, Tamamo merely seems like a powerful yōkai who manipulates and fights as a means for his own selfish desires. After fighting alongside Nūbē and class 5-3 and solving a number of youkai problems, he grew fonder and fonder of the human race, to the extent that he would use "Megido", his most powerful fire-based ability, in order to destroy Zekki, the younger brother of Nūbē's Oni no Te. Tamamo also found himself unable to take Hiroshi's skull even when the opportunity presented himself later on, having learned too much of the human heart. This is a problem for him, as without a suitable skull his mental and physical faculties would eventually erode, leaving him to die as only a shell of his former self.

In the manga liner notes for Volume 2, the author stated that Tamamo was intended to be a direct descendant of the Nine-Tailed Kitsune who was notorious as Tamamo no Mae. However, the fox appeared later in the story and was less than fond of Tamamo, thus leaving the name to be most likely an allusion, perhaps out of respect.

Voiced by: Toshiyuki Morikawa
Played by: Mokomichi Hayami

The Golden Nine-Tail Kitsune
Considered to be one of the most powerful yōkai in existence, The Golden Nine-Tail Kitsune (Konmougyokumen Kyūbi no Kitsune
金毛玉面九尾の狐) is one of the few beings that can overpower even the Oni. In ancient times, this kitsune made its way across India and China to Japan, where it last appeared 800 years ago as Tamamo no Mae, the wife who bewitched the Emperor Toba. Based within a chamber beneath the Sesshou Stone in Nasuno, Tochigi Prefecture, it has an immense hatred for humans and only desires either the death or lack of exposure to these "lower beings". Nūbē is forced to undertake various tests from this powerful 3000-year old yōkai when Tamamo slowly falls apart due to his failure to complete his "transformation jutsu" abilities. Besides having immense abilities in illusion, transformation and fire, it can also summon a special "Trial Jar" for its yōko followers to deem their worthiness by undertaking escape without the use of their powers. Eventually, the fox also grew interested in Tamamo's fondness of humanity, and grants him enough power to continue living in his current form.

Tsuwabukimaru
Tsuwabukimaru( 石蕗丸) appears when Tamamo becomes very sick, reminding him of his path to complete his "transformation justu" in order to prevent from turning into ashes. He is a young kitsune who holds a great deal of admiration for Tamamo, and does not want him to die. Not understanding the relationship the Tamamo now holds with humans, he was intent on getting Hiroshi's skull and was only stopped at the last second by the person he himself admired. He blames Nūbē for Tamamo's slide into weakness and his eventual degradation, although he was still convinced to lead the teacher to the Nine-Tailed Kitsune. Tsuwabukimaru dresses and acts like a  ninja, attacking with two sharp blades attached to his arms and moves along with the wind. Despite his male name, it is suggested that the skull he uses to take human form may be that of a girl, as Nūbē teased Tamamo about him when he showed up. His personality, while straightforward and determined, is also slightly naive and ditzy.

Mountain Yōkai
In the northern Tohoku region of Japan, there exists a collection of various yōkai associated with the local elemental natures of their region, such as rock, wind, snow and ice. The guardian of these yōkai is a powerful mountain god whose word regarding his spirit is law, dominating them and forcing them to either obey or face the consequences. These beings have a detached nature from humanity, carrying a cold, emotionless existence similar to the cold winds that blow in their region: they merely exist alongside humans and the fate of these humans are determined by their whims. However, the nature between these mountain yokai and humans would eventually be challenged by one yuki-onna and the man that she loves...

Yukime
One of several yōkai from the mountains of northern Japan, Yukime (ゆきめ/雪姫) is a 16-year old yuki-onna whose life was complicated due to her love for Nūbē. The connection was originally made five years prior, when Nube gets lost while skiing and saves her from a hunter determined to kill her before she grows up to harm his village.

Yukime promises that she will eventually find him so they could be together "in eternal love". The meaning of this was eventually made clear when she came down to Doumori, intent on taking him home frozen in ice "for eternity". She still has a warm heart, however, so she is convinced that he shouldn't be taken to the mountains thanks to the efforts of Nūbē's students; when she tried to attack them, Nūbē tells her to leave, but she returns to work as an ice skating coach at the local skating rink and tries to win his heart.

Yukime possesses several powers and weaknesses due to her connections with snow, ice and the cold. Yukime's main ability is the creation of snow or ice from her body, using it as a means to freeze any target she can see or point at. Her freezing power is useful in offensive attacks, the creation of roadblocks to stop larger targets, and even can be used to concentrate light like a magnifying glass. (not to mention it is useful for making shaved ice, which according to Nūbē is the only good thing Yukime's power is for)  Yukime also possesses a slight healing ability and, due to her cold connections, has a natural talent for figure skating.

Being a snow yōkai has its weaknesses: she can not stand intense heat. Furthermore, Yukime can not make hot foods nor can she wear certain black clothing for fear of melting certain parts of her body. But Yukime does have a cute remedy for temperature problems: when she becomes too hot, she wraps her entire body into a snowman to cool herself down, and can drive Nūbē crazy when she pops out of it… completely naked. While many of these heat problems were eventually remedied through a revival later in the series, Yukime does occasionally still have problems with hotter temperatures.

While Yukime becomes a valuable ally and nuisance in Doumori, it is her relationship with Nūbē that drives most of her character through the series. After her first appearance, she eventually has a love/hate relationship with the teacher, with several of her attempts to get Nūbē to fall for her leading to some acknowledgment, but further frustration for both of them. Making matters worse is beautiful and ultra-sensitive Ritsuko-sensei, whom Nūbē originally desires and whom eventually begins to return some of her feelings just as Yukime is starting to get through to him.

Yukime is tricked into capturing the teacher, believing that the sacrifice of Ritsuko is needed to make her human. However she cannot kill Ritsuko through pity; it is a test to see if she still possesses a cold yuki-onna's heart. Nūbē finally saves them both, apologizing to her and admitting his love for the latter. It is too late, however, as a severely injured Yukime uses the last of her powers to help destroy the youkai and turns into snowflakes in Nūbē's arms.

While Nūbē believes her to be dead, her snowflakes are carried away to her mountains, where the Mountain god uses them to create another yuki-onna in her place, with exactly the same looks and exactly the same name. This Yukime, however, has a cold heart and does not hesitate to kill. Nūbē finds her during a school trip, where she tricks him away from his class in order to kill him. He allows her to attack him, but not without invoking Yukime's memories. Confused, the "new" Yukime flees.

Yukime returned to Doumori later to find closure to her conflicting feelings, and realizing she did love Nūbē, decided to stay and reconcile the two halves of herself. Although she did not remember much of her life before, it was implied that Yukime eventually recovered all of her memories. Her personality was also changed from the aggressive yuki-onna youkai to a balance between her childish former self and assertive new identity.

The last chapter of the manga features Nūbē and Yukime's Wedding, while originally in a normal Japanese wedding company's location, Nūbē was delayed by a yōkai and cannot meet the time of the ceremony. They decided to hold the ceremony with Yukime creating a chapel of ice on the playground in the primary school Nūbē teaches and instead of a Catholic priest, the recurring character Buddhist priest in the series held the position instead.

In the anime, there was an alternate world created in Kyouko's dreams and subconscious, created by a youkai that had possessed her in her sleep. In that alternate world, Yukime had grown into a full-fledged yuki-onna and still was at Doumori, but she wasn't with Nūbē anymore since he was in a catatonic state after being almost murdered by another youkai. (note: although the chapter existed in the manga, Yukime was not in the original chapter since she had yet to return to Dōmori at this time)

Voiced by: Yuri Shiratori
Played by: Kang Ji-young

The Mountain God
The kami of an unnamed mountain in an unnamed province that was Yukime's birthplace. He is her creator, a being of nature that is outside of human understanding. His greatest priority is the balance of nature, which caused him to grow displeased at Yukime's intention to live in the human world with Nūbē. As far as he was concerned, Yukime was created to bring snow and balance to the mountain's winters, and taking her away disrupts that balance. Nothing else matters in the equation. The Mountain God sent servants after her, but after they were all defeated by Nūbē, his displeasure grew in a more grotesque form---namely by causing the people in nearby villages to grow tree branches all over their skin. Yukime and Nūbē attempted to placate him failed, and they would have died in the Mountain God's wrath if not for Nūbē's father, who used himself as a human pillar to seal away the kami's anger and allow his son to finally live a happy life.

The Mountain God's appearance is that of a gigantic human face and hands on a large rock cliff. Trees grow above him and pools of magma bubbles beneath him.

Voiced by: Hisao Egawa

Servants of the Mountain God
After Yukime disobeys his orders regarding the pursuit of Nūbē, the Mountain God sends several other yokai of the mountain after her and her beloved, each one using a different tactic to separate the two.
 Ippon Datara (一本ダタラ Ippon Datara): A yokai with the appearance of a disfigured, one-legged monk, he comes to Yukime stating that the only way that she can ever gain the love of a human is to become one by freezing the body of a beautiful woman. (who in this case turns out to be Ritsuko-sensei) Using the power of his one-eye, he abducts the female teacher, leaving her slightly frozen for Yukime to finish the job. But his true intention was to have her kill in order for her to regain the cold heart she had lost, thus becoming a true yuki-onna again and allowing her to rejoin the Mountain God. Yukime releases Ritsuko-sensei, but Datara freezes her and stabs her with icicles for her betrayal. Eventually, while Nūbē and Yukime were able to defeat him, she had been too worn down by the assassin to last too much longer...though when she fades away, she finally does have Nūbē's acknowledgement of his love.
 Kodama Mice (こだまねずみ Kodama Nezumi): Originally from Akita Prefecture, these small spies sneak in to Yukime's satchel after she returns to Doumori following her revival. Watching Yukime until the time was right, they have the ability to inflate themselves like balloons until they ultimately burst, killing anyone that has broken the law of the Mountain God. Though they nearly wipe out Yukime, Nūbē and his class, he is able to save everyone with a well-timed sutra prior to explosion.
 Tsulala (つらら Tsulala): Although she appears like a mature, buxom black-haired woman, she is actually Yukime's identical twin sister. In their youth, the two of them spent plenty of time together, but Tsulala consistently played practical jokes on the white-haired yuki-onna which consistently made her get reformed or shredded into snowflakes. But when she appears before her sister and Nube, it is as a messenger from the Mountain God sent to either take her back peacefully or kill her, believing she will only bring bad luck to Nūbē if she stays with humans. Tsulala's own abilities allows her to manipulate ice, but her specialty is to create ice copies of any object she sees and use it like a living, working model. (including machines and animals) In the end, Yukime defeats her by creating a giant ice magnifying glass, weakening her ice abilities to the point of being unusable. (but unlike the other messengers, Tsulala does get away)
 The Stone Tengu (岩天狗 Iwatengu): An extremely powerful yokai completely made of stone, he is the very last and strongest of the servants of the Mountain God, pursuing Nūbē long after his master had been destroyed. After Nūbē and Yukime finally get engaged, he pursues the potential groom the day before and of his wedding, creating illusions with his "Anxiety Wind" to make the teacher realize the horrors of marrying a yuki-onna. Making Nūbē experience a sleepless night, he nearly drives him to his death...until the power of Baki (the Oni no Te, by this time working alongside the teacher better) saves his life. Although the tengu further increases his wind powers by increasing his nose's length and even unleashes the ultimate wind abilities, he is ultimately crushed when Baki is fully released, as Nūbē realizes that he can live happily ever after with a yuki-onna.

Yukibe
Yukibe was a child who looked like a mixture between Yukime and Nūbē, whom everyone assumed was caused by their union. His real origin, however, was solely based on Yukime's powers. Apparently, as a yuki-onna reaches maturity, she develops a power to create a snow-child (Yuki-Warashi) who would play with her before flying off into the mountains, a way she brings winter to the world. Yukibe possessed the freezing power that Yukime has, and he caused a great deal of havoc before finally flying off, bringing snow to Doumori. Although this is Yukibe's only real appearance, Nūbē consistently is reminded of him whenever he imagines the idea of him and Yukime having a real child, giving him further disgust over the relationship between a human and a yuki-onna.

Voiced by Chika Sakamoto

Other Yōkai
While many, many yōkai appear within Nūbē either as threats or assistance to the class and the citizens of Doumori, certain ones has multiple appearances and a consistent connection with the characters in the series.

Zashiki Warashi
Zashiki Warashi (座敷わらし) is a small, child like yōkai known for being a bringer of good luck towards anyone that is even near it. Merely being within its reach gives a bit of luck to a person, but befriending it can allow it to follow you around giving luck to you for much longer periods. Usually she can not be seen by normal people, though.

Nūbē initially encounters this yōkai after having a particularly lucky streak at a pachinko parlor. (though it is unknown if it was the cause of his good fortune; though it s suggested he was using his powers to win) After feeding it some senbei, it follows him back to school where it causes one good thing after another for the students in his class (even Hiroshi gets an 80 on his test because of it, which is good considering how non-booksmart to the point of idiocy he is) He tries to convince the yōkai that they don't need it, scaring it away, but it returns to end up saving Hiroshi from a possibly fatal accident. In another incident, Zashiki Warashi reveals a power of reversing fortunes, making the yuki-onna Yukime become befuddled by disasters, the worst of which was witnessing a date between her beloved Nūbē and Ritsuko-sensei.

Zashiki Warashi's last major appearance revealed that there was more to the yōkai than originally suggested. She was revealed to be the dead spirit of a poor young girl who lived fifty years ago. The girl cared more about others and helped them out even though she had so little. She eventually caught pneumonia and chose to wish for the health and happiness of everyone around her instead of herself even as she laid on her deathbed. Nūbē and his class chose to give thanks to Zashiki Warashi for all it did, holding it a party for all its done for them and even allowing her to see her mother one more time. But even so, Zashiki Warashi's work is never done.

Kuchisake-onna
The Kuchisake-onna (口裂け女) is a legendary yōkai of strange circumstances, even in the world of Nūbē. Some legends say that she is the result of horrific dental surgery from 80 years ago, giving her a gaping mouth and jagged teeth. She wanders around various towns with bandages hiding her mouth, asking children if she's pretty before removing them and scaring them away. In actuality, the Kuchisake-onna is the result of an animal possession, the result of an encounter with the grudge of an inugami giving this female their demonic-appearing mouth. The students of Nūbē's class encounter a kuchisake-onna after hearing the former legend, trying to fend themselves off with pomade to escape it. But the teacher is able to show them their error, using the Oni no Te to remove the spirit and show the beautiful female underneath the beast. This one particular kuchisake-onna (her name revealed later as Honomi) is later revealed to be the youngest of three kuchisake-sisters, all of whom live together and occasionally get into trouble due to their infamy and connection with the legends behind their mouths.

Hayame
Hayame (速魚) is a sweet but extremely ditsy mermaid who occasionally assists Nūbē...even though he usually ends up regretting it. She usually takes one of two forms when she appears: either that of a typical mermaid (nude with her long green hair covering her bosom and an orange fin on the bottom) or in a human form which she can access by magically turning her fin into two human legs (the formation of legs usually has her revealing her privates after transformation, much to the embrassment of any male that happens to be near her at the time). Like the mermaids of Japanese legend, she has the ability to grant immortality to anyone who eats her flesh, as well as the ability to reverse the same immortality from someone who eats her liver. Similarly, her blood also has healing properties: one small drip can instantly heal anyone of all of their wounds, even fatal ones. But there is a small drawback to Hayame's healing properties: the receiver of her healing blood is rendered a complete idiot for a short period of time after being healed. Also, Hayame possesses the ability to control and manipulate people's emotions by singing, similar to the mythical sirens.

Hayame actually came to become connected to Nūbē by strange circumstances: introduced as the mummified corpse of a mermaid possessed by the priest Oshō, the teacher ends up giving it some of the spiritual power of his Oni no Te in when the idiot priest forces him to try and revive it. Though the project seemed a failure after Nūbē spent thirty minutes giving it spiritual energy, the corpse did revive overnight and the awakened female chose to thank the teacher by giving him the gift of immortality. When Nūbē did meet the living Hayame, he thought she was a crazy overworked student who was losing her mind due to cram school. When he finally realized the truth, he apologized and discovered that she was mummified after being away from the sea for two hundred years after coming ashore for a festival. He subsequently declines her immortality offer, but ends up having his life saved by her after nearly killing himself to save a child.

Although Hayame finally returns to the sea after this incident, she consistently drops in to Dōmori one way or another, leading to Nūbē getting stuck with her time and again. Many of her actions ends up making her look like a juvenile teenager instead of the long-lived yōkai she is. She ends up getting caught by scientists when she just wants to buy a CD player and even wanted to use her singing abilities to get on a local talent show. But even with her faults, Hayame continues to show a caring, helpful personality that chooses to assist those in need. (even if it does sometimes screw everything up)
Voiced by: Wakana Yamazaki

Kudagitsune
The kudagitsune (くだ狐) are small, long animal yōkai known from the Tohoku region who live in tubes and are commonly used as the assisting yōkai of itako such as local spiritualist Izuna Hazuki. Unseen by average humans, they are able to fly about doing the task of the one who controls them, whether it is investigating information for the user, communication or to fly inside a human's body to gather needed thoughts. All kudagitsune are usually under the control of whomever it is born to or raised by, but can be easily controlled by beings of greater power. Tamamo, for example, is able to stop or control them due to being much simpler animal yōkai than himself.

Most of the kudagitsune within Nūbē belong to Izuna, who uses them as both her help and servants. Keeping hundreds of them within her own apartment of various shapes and sizes, they end up cleaning up and looking after her until they are needed. Those that Izuna keeps for duty are kept in small lipstick vials which she releases for the need of herself or for others. Another user of kudagitsune include Nūbē himself, who ends up creating one named Baco when the energies of one kudagitsune combined with the energy of the Oni no Te, giving birth to a demonic-appearing yōkai that assists the teacher when not living inside a pen. Other kudagitsune are used by the villainous Priest Kanran, who keeps several kudagitsune on him including his most powerful one in his left eye-socket.

The most powerful and legendary of the kudagitsune within the series is Gedo, a giant, but slightly dumb being with immense potential for power. Born once every 300 years in the heart of a mountain in Tohoku, he has the ultimate potential of releasing the "True Treasure" of whatever your greatest desire is. The giant kudagitsune unexpectedly ends up in the hands of Izuna, who ends up giving birth to him and forced to protect it from the evil Kanran, who desires the treasure that Gedo may unlock.

Kesaran Pasaran
Although it appears at first like a small white fuzzball, Kesaran Pasaran (ケサランパサラン) is an extremely useful and lucky yōkai to whoever encounters it. Unknown in its origin (though one legend suggests it as a gift from angels), Kesaran Pasaran is notable for bringing good luck and happiness to anyone who encounters it. More intriguingly, the amount of the small fuzzballs can quickly multiply if kept within the vicinity of face powder for a period of time: the more Kesaran Pasaran, the more good luck,  The yōkai is initially encountered by Miki during a Christmas party, who initially uses its luck abilities and its multiplication trick to grant all her desires, but ultimately ends up saving her friends and giving a happy holiday to the entire town in the process. Later on, the Kesaran Pasaran are revealed to be the "yōkai of ultimate good", saving both the town of Dōmori, and ultimately the world, from the unleashed power of the ultimate evil yōkai: Yamato no Orochi.

Hell Teacher Nūbē
Lists of anime and manga characters